The City of London was a United Kingdom Parliamentary constituency. It was a constituency of the House of Commons of the Parliament of England then of the Parliament of Great Britain from 1707 to 1800 and of the Parliament of the United Kingdom from 1801 to 1950.

Boundaries and boundary changes
This borough constituency (or 'parliamentary borough/burgh') consisted of the City of London, which is at the very centre of Greater London. The only change by the Parliamentary Boundaries Act 1832 was to include The Temple.

Bounded south by the Thames, the City adjoins Westminster westward, enfranchised in 1545.  In other directions a web of tiny liberties and parishes of diverse size adjoined from medieval times until the 20th century. Most of the population of Middlesex was beyond the city's boundaries. From the 17th century three of four new 'divisions' of Ossulstone Hundred adjoined the city reflecting their relative density – Holborn division and Finsbury division to the north and Tower division to the north-east and the east, all enfranchised in 1832.

London is first known to have been enfranchised and represented in Parliament in 1298. Because it was the most important city in England it received four seats in Parliament instead of the normal two for a constituency. Previous to 1298 from the middle of that century, the intermittent first parliaments, the area's households, officially, could turn to their Middlesex "two knights of the shire" – two members of the Commons – as to their interests in Parliament as the City formed part of the geographic county yet from early times wielded independent administration, its corporation.

The city was represented by four MPs until 1885, when this was cut to two, and in 1950 the constituency was abolished.

The City of London was originally a densely populated area. Before the Reform Act 1832 the composition of the City electorate was not as democratic as that of some other borough constituencies, such as neighbouring Westminster. The right of election was held by members of the Livery Companies. However the size and wealth of the community meant that it had more voters than most other borough constituencies. Namier and Brooke estimated the size of the City electorate, in the latter part of the 18th century, at about 7,000. Only Westminster had a larger size of electorate.

During the 19th and 20th centuries the metropolitan area of London expanded greatly. The resident population of the City fell.  People moved to the new definitively urban expansion and suburbs; businesses moved in. However the City authorities did not want to extend their jurisdiction beyond the traditional "square mile" so the constituency was left unchanged as its resident population fell. By 1900 almost all electors in the City qualified through Livery Company membership and lived outside of the city. The business voters were a type of plural voter which when abolished by the Representation of the People Act 1948 meant the City became immediately under-sized in electorate, akin to the least-worst examples of pre-1832 "rotten and pocket boroughs".

In 1950 the area was merged for Parliamentary purposes with the eldest parts of the neighbouring City of Westminster, to form the seat Cities of London and Westminster. The pre-1900 heavily subdivided city became simplified for the period 1907 and 1965 into one civil parish, before in that year this level of local government complication was taken away.  Statutory protection applied between 1986 and 2011 to prevent division of the City between seats:

Members of Parliament 1707–1950
See City of London (elections to the Parliament of England) for citizens known to have represented the City in Parliament before 1707

Parliaments of Great Britain 1707–1800

Note:-
(a) Expelled

Parliament of the United Kingdom from 1801

MPs 1801–1885

MPs 1885–1950

Elections 
In multi-member elections the bloc voting system was used. Voters could cast a vote for one to four (or up to two in two-member elections 1885–1950) candidates, as they chose. The leading candidates with the largest number of votes were elected. In 1868 the limited vote was introduced, which restricted an individual elector to using one, two or three votes, in elections to fill four seats.

In by-elections, to fill a single-seat, the first past the post system applied.

After 1832, when registration of voters was introduced, a turnout figure is given for contested elections. In multi-member elections, when the exact number of participating voters is unknown, this is calculated by dividing the number of votes by four (to 1868), three (1868–1885) and two thereafter. To the extent that electors did not use all their votes this will be an underestimate of turnout.

Where a party had more than one candidate in one or both of a pair of successive elections change is calculated for each individual candidate, otherwise change is based on the party vote.

Candidates for whom no party has been identified are classified as non-partisan. The candidate might have been associated with a party or faction in Parliament or consider himself to belong to a particular political tradition. Political parties before the 19th century were not as cohesive or organised as they later became. Contemporary commentators (even the reputed leaders of parties or factions) in the 18th century did not necessarily agree who the party supporters were. The traditional parties, which had arisen in the late 17th century, became increasingly irrelevant to politics in the 18th century (particularly after 1760), although for some contests in some constituencies party labels were still used. It was only towards the end of the century that party labels began to acquire some meaning again, although this process was by no means complete for several more generations.

Sources: The results are based on the History of Parliament Trust's volumes on the House of Commons in various periods from 1715 to 1820, Stooks Smith from 1820 until 1832 and Craig from 1832. Where Stooks Smith gives additional information this is indicated in a note. See references below for further details of these sources.

Dates of general and by-elections from 1660 to 1715 (excluding general elections at which no new MP was returned)

Parliament of Great Britain election results 1713–1800

Elections in the 1710s

 6,787 voted. The losing candidates demanded a scrutiny, which did not change the result. (Source: Copy of the pollbook)

Elections in the 1720s

 After a scrutiny the members returned were unchanged and vote totals were amended to Lockwood 4,025; Barnard 3,840; Godfrey 3,723; Child 3,575; Heysham 3,441; Parsons 3,393.
 Death of Godfrey 10 November 1724

 After a scrutiny the members returned were unchanged and vote totals were amended to Eyles 3,539; Barnard 3,514; Perry 3,396; Parsons 3,255; Thompson 3,244; Lockwood 2,977; Hopkins 2,921; Williams 2,914.

Elections in the 1730s

 Note (1734): Poll 7 days (Source: Stooks Smith)

Elections in the 1740s

 Note (1741): Poll 7 days (Source: Stooks Smith)
 Death of Godschall 26 June 1742

Elections in the 1750s

 Note (1754): Poll 7 days, 5,931 voted (Source: Stooks Smith)
 Death of Bethell 1 November 1758

Elections in the 1760s

 Note (1761): Poll 7 days (Source: Stooks Smith)

Elections in the 1770s
 Death of Beckford 21 June 1770

 Death of Ladbroke 31 October 1773

Elections in the 1780s

 Death of Kirkman 19 September 1780

 Death of Hayley 30 August 1781

 Death of Bull 10 January 1784

 Note (1784 be): Poll 3 days (Source: Stooks Smith)

 Note (1784): Poll 7 days. Mr Pitt was returned on the show of hands, but retired before the poll. (Source: Stooks Smith)

Elections in the 1790s

 Note (1790): Poll 7 days (Source: Stooks Smith)
 Appointment of Watson as Commissary General

 Note (1793): Mr Newnham was a candidate, but declined to go to the poll. (Source: Stooks Smith)
 Death of Sawbridge 21 February 1795

 Note (1795): Poll 3 days (Source: Stooks Smith)

 Note (1796): Poll 7 days (Source: Stooks Smith)

Parliament of the United Kingdom election results (4 seats) 1801–1885

Elections in the 1800s

 Note (1802): Poll 7 days (Source: Stooks Smith)

 Note (1806): Poll 3 days (Source: Stooks Smith)

 Note (1807): Mr Hankey died on the afternoon of the first day's polling. All the candidates voted for him. (Source: Stooks Smith)

Elections in the 1810s

 Note (1812): Mr Hunter, the Lord Mayor of the City of London, retired before the poll. (Source: Stooks Smith)
 Resignation of Combe

 Note (1818): Poll 7 days, 7,978 voted. (Source: Stooks Smith)

Elections in the 1820s

 Note (1820): Poll 7 days (Source: Stooks Smith)

 Note (1826): Poll 7 days. 8,639 voted. Alderman Garrett was proposed without his consent. (Source: Stooks Smith)

Elections in the 1830s

 

 Death of Waithman 6 February 1833

 Resignation of Key by accepting the office of Steward of the Chiltern Hundreds

Elections in the 1840s

 

 Death of Wood 25 September 1843

 Appointment of Russell as Prime Minister and First Lord of the Treasury

 

 Note (1847):  De Rothschild and Payne were classified as Reformer candidates. (Source: Stooks Smith)
 Resignation of de Rothschild to seek re-election after rejection of the Jewish Disabilities Bill

 Note (1849): De Rothschild was classified as a Reformer candidate. (Source: Stooks Smith)
 Death of Pattison June 1849

Elections in the 1850s

 

 Appointment of Russell as Secretary of State for Foreign Affairs

 Appointment of Russell as Lord President of the Council

 Appointment of Russell as Secretary of State for the Colonies

 

 Resignation of de Rothschild to seek re-election after rejection of the Jewish Disabilities Bill

 Appointment of Russell as Secretary of State for Foreign Affairs

Elections in the 1860s
 Creation of Russell as the 1st Earl Russell

 Death of Wood 17 May 1863

 
 

 

 Appointment of Goschen as Chancellor of the Duchy of Lancaster

 

 

 Note (1868): Craig refers to R.N. de Rothschild, but Stenton confirms the candidate was L.N. de Rothschild
 Appointment of Goschen as President of the Poor Law Board

 Death of Bell 9 February 1869

Elections in the 1870s

 

 

 Note (1874): Craig refers to R.N. de Rothschild, but Stenton confirms the candidate was L.N. de Rothschild

Elections in the 1880s

 

 Reduction of constituency to two seats, in the 1885 redistribution

Parliament of the United Kingdom election results (2 seats) 1885–1950

Elections in the 1880s

Fowler was elevated to the peerage, becoming Lord Addington, requiring a by-election.

Elections in the 1890s
Baring's death caused a by-election.

Fowler's death caused a by-election.

Elections in the 1900s

Elections in the 1910s

Elections in the 1920s

Elections in the 1930s

Elections in the 1940s

See also 
 Duration of English, British and United Kingdom parliaments from 1660
 List of parliamentary constituencies in London
 Cities of London and Westminster (UK Parliament constituency)

References

Bibliography
 Boundaries of Parliamentary Constituencies 1885-1972, compiled and edited by F.W.S. Craig (Political Reference Publications 1972)
 British Parliamentary Election Results 1832-1885, compiled and edited by F.W.S. Craig (The Macmillan Press 1977)
 British Parliamentary Election Results 1885-1918, compiled and edited by F.W.S. Craig (The Macmillan Press 1974)
 British Parliamentary Election Results 1918-1949, compiled and edited by F.W.S. Craig (The Macmillan Press 1977)
 The House of Commons 1715-1754, by Romney Sedgwick (HMSO 1970)
 The House of Commons 1754-1790, by Sir Lewis Namier and John Brooke (HMSO 1964)
 The Parliaments of England by Henry Stooks Smith (1st edition published in three volumes 1844–50), second edition edited (in one volume) by F.W.S. Craig (Political Reference Publications 1973)
 Who's Who of British Members of Parliament: Volume I 1832-1885, edited by M. Stenton (The Harvester Press 1976)
 The Times, various editions, was used to obtain dates of elections or unopposed returns and first names of candidates not available in the above books (from 1885 to 1910). The dates of declarations are used before 1885 and the dates of the General Election polling day from 1918.

Politics of the City of London
Parliamentary constituencies in London (historic)
Constituencies of the Parliament of the United Kingdom established in 1298
Constituencies of the Parliament of the United Kingdom disestablished in 1950
Constituencies of the Parliament of the United Kingdom represented by a sitting Prime Minister
Political history of Middlesex